Kapitän zur See Fritz Antek Berger (15 April 1900 in Allenstein, East Prussia (now Olsztyn, Poland) – 27 June 1973 in Bielefeld) was a Knight's Cross of the Iron Cross recipient during World War II.

Life
He joined the Imperial German Navy in 1917. 

He was in British captivity from May 1945 until May 1948.

Awards
 Iron Cross (1939)
 2nd Class (16 November 1939)
 1st Class (15 December 1939)
 Wound Badge (1939)
 in Black 
 Destroyer War Badge (1940)
 Narvik Shield
 Knight's Cross of the Iron Cross on 4 August 1940 as Fregattenkapitän and chief of the 1. Zerstörerflotille

References

Citations

Bibliography

External links
 Fritz Berger @ Deutsche Marinesoldaten

1900 births
1973 deaths
Reichsmarine personnel
Kriegsmarine personnel
Recipients of the Knight's Cross of the Iron Cross
People from Olsztyn
People from East Prussia